Hrímgrímnir (Old Norse: , 'frost-masked') is a jötunn in Norse mythology. He is invoked by Freyr's servant Skírnir as he tries to coerce the beautiful jötunn Gerðr on his master's behalf.

Name 
The Old Norse name Hrímgrímnir has been translated as 'frost-masked'.

Attestations 
In Skírnismál (The Lay of Skírnir), after Gerðr refuses to marry Freyr, his messenger Skírnir threatens her with a curse involving her marriage to Hrímgrímnir in Hel:
Hrímgrímnir is also mentioned in the þulur among fellow jötnar but is not otherwise found elsewhere.

Theories 
Scholar John Lindow comments that Hrímgrímnir is evidently a "part of something bigger"; if Gerðr refuses Skírnir's offer, she will "be denied all ordinary sexual congress", resulting in social consequences—even though she would be married, she would live in social exile.

Notes

References

Jötnar